Alcohol dehydrogenase 6 is an enzyme that in humans is encoded by the ADH6 gene.

This gene encodes class V alcohol dehydrogenase, which is a member of the alcohol dehydrogenase family. Members of this family metabolize a wide variety of substrates, including ethanol, retinol, other aliphatic alcohols, hydroxysteroids, and lipid peroxidation products. This gene is expressed in the stomach as well as in the liver, and it contains a glucocorticoid response element upstream of its 5' UTR, which is a steroid hormone receptor binding site. The deduced amino acid sequence of the open reading frame of this gene shows about 60% positional identity with other known alcohol dehydrogenases. This gene may have a distinct physiologic function.

References

Further reading

External links